Ben Lawrence may refer to:

 Ben Lawrence (director) (born 1973), Australian photographer and director of TV commercials and short films
 Ben Lawrence (American football) (born 1961), American football guard 
 Ben St Lawrence (born 1981), Australian long-distance runner